Landis is a surname. Notable people with the surname include:
Arthur H. Landis, American science fiction and fantasy writer
Bill Landis, American baseball player
Carole Landis, American film actress
Charles B. Landis, U.S. Representative from Indiana
Charles K. Landis, American property developer in southern New Jersey
Cullen Landis, American film actor
David Landis, American politician
Evgenii Landis, Russian mathematician
Floyd Landis, American cyclist
Forrest Landis, American child actor
Frederick Landis, U.S. Representative from Indiana
Geoffrey A. Landis, American scientist and science fiction writer
James M. Landis, American lawyer, academic, and government official
James Nobel Landis, American electrical-power engineer
James P. Landis, soldier in the American Civil War and Medal of Honor recipient
Jean Landis, American aviator
Jessie Royce Landis, American actress
Jill Marie Landis, American romance author
Jim Landis, American baseball player
John Landis, American film actor and director
John D. Landis (urban planner), Professor of City and Regional Planning at the University of Pennsylvania
Joshua Landis, American scholar of the Middle East
Kenesaw Mountain Landis, U.S. Federal judge and Commissioner of Major League Baseball
Mark A. Landis, American art forger
Max Landis, American screenwriter
Merkel Landis, American lawyer and businessman
Michele Landis Dauber, American academic
Nina Landis, Australian actress